Sir Charles Thomas Davis, GCMG (1873 – 1 January 1938) was a British civil servant. He was Permanent Under-Secretary of State for Dominion Affairs from 1925 to 1930.

References 

 https://www.ukwhoswho.com/view/10.1093/ww/9780199540891.001.0001/ww-9780199540884-e-208389
 https://www.nytimes.com/1938/01/03/archives/sir-charles-t-davis-british-state-aide-retired-undersecretary-of.html

1873 births
1938 deaths